Oscar Nunez (born November 18, 1958), sometimes credited as Oscar Nuñez, is a Cuban-American actor. He is best known for his role as the Dunder Mifflin accountant Oscar Martinez on NBC's The Office.

He was a member of The Groundlings and later became a regular cast member on The Office. He also created and co-starred in the Comedy Central series Halfway Home in 2007, and in 2014 co-starred in the short-lived USA Network comedy series Benched. Since 2018, he has appeared in a series of State Farm commercials.

Early life and education
Nunez was born in Colón, Cuba. Nunez's mother, a dentist, and father, a lawyer, attended school at the University of Havana while Fidel Castro was a student there. The family moved first to Caracas, Venezuela in 1960 and then to the United States. His family moved to Boston when he was two years old and then to Union City, New Jersey, when he was four. He became a naturalized American citizen in 1964. He is bilingual, speaking English and Spanish. Nunez attended various colleges in New York, including Fashion Institute of Technology and the Parsons School of Design for writing. He became a certified dental technician after studying at the Magna Institute of Dental Technology.

Career 
Nunez started his comedy career in New York, performing over 300 shows with The Shock of the Funny theater company. The troupe was active in the East Village for several years. In addition to his work with Shock, Nunez appeared in theater in New York and Washington, D.C. before moving to Los Angeles in the mid 1990s. In L.A., he joined The Groundlings and performed in their Sunday Company. While with the Groundlings, he wrote and starred in a production called "Smooth Down There."

In 1997, Nunez graduated from the Warner Brothers Comedy Writer's Workshop. In 1999, he was a finalist in the ABC Latino Writers Project.

In 1998, he appeared on the game show Match Game but was not a winner. Nunez was Adam Carolla's stand-in on The Man Show.

Nunez's television credits include Malcolm in the Middle, 24, Curb Your Enthusiasm, Reno 911!, The District and Mad TV, in addition to his role on The Office. He was also the creator and executive producer of the Comedy Central series Halfway Home, in which he co-starred as the character Eulogio Pla.

His film credits include The Italian Job (as a security guard), Reno 911!: Miami, and When Do We Eat?. In 2009, Nunez played the role of Ramon, the caterer, stripper, soda jerk, and finally clergy performing the wedding ceremony in The Proposal. In 2012, Nunez played the role of Jose Baez, an attorney in the Lifetime movie Prosecuting Casey Anthony.

Nunez appeared as one of eight judges in the 2010 Miss USA Contest, posing a question about the Arizona undocumented immigrant law to Miss Oklahoma USA, Morgan Elizabeth Woolard. Nunez was booed by the audience before finishing the question; however he asked the audience to wait until he finished the question before they reacted. Although Woolard replied that she supports the law as a state rights issue, she added that she is against racial profiling.

In 2014, Nunez co-starred alongside Eliza Coupe and Jay Harrington in the short-lived USA Network comedy series Benched.

In 2016, Nunez appeared as a regular in the TBS comedy series, People of Earth.

In 2018, Nunez portrayed State Farm Insurance Agent Cole Perez in a series of commercials.

In July 2018, Nunez took on the role of Desi Arnaz, starring in the world premiere production of I Love Lucy: A Funny Thing Happened on the Way to the Sitcom, a behind-the-scenes stage comedy about I Love Lucy by Gregg Oppenheimer (son of series creator Jess Oppenheimer). Recorded before a live audience at the UCLA's James Bridges Theater, the L.A. Theatre Works production aired on public radio and has been released on Audio CD and as a downloadable mp3.

From 2019 to 2020, Nunez portrayed Assistant Principal Carlos Hernandez on the Netflix original comedy series Mr. Iglesias.

Personal life

Nunez is married to actress Ursula Whittaker, who gave birth to their first child on October 4, 2012.

Filmography

Film

Television

References

External links

 
 Oscar Nuñez at NBC.com's The Office

1958 births
Living people
American male comedians
American entertainers of Cuban descent
American male television actors
American television writers
American male television writers
Male actors from New Jersey
Contestants on American game shows
Hispanic and Latino American male actors
People from Union City, New Jersey
People from Colón, Cuba
Fashion Institute of Technology alumni
20th-century American male actors
21st-century American male actors
Cuban emigrants to the United States
Screenwriters from New Jersey
20th-century American comedians
21st-century American comedians
Television producers from New Jersey